Harry Noel Pringle (25 December 190330 March  1985) was an Australian radio and television producer who worked on light entertainment programmes in England and Australia.

Biography 
Harry Pringle was the son of Edith Ogilvie Benzley, and Harry Lempriere Pringle (1869, Hobart, Tasmania1914, London, England). His father was an operatic bass who sang at Covent Garden, London and the Metropolitan Opera, New York. Pringle worked in music hall, until in 1937 he became one of the first producers on BBC Television. Between February 1937 and August 1939, he was credited 112 times as TV producer (nearly six programmes a month), three times as director, and once as editor; he was at the same time producing radio programmes.

On 1 September 1939, BBC Television broadcasting was suspended because of the outbreak of World War II, and only resumed in June 1946. In 1940, Pringle relocated to Australia, where he was appointed to take charge of radio light entertainment for the Australian Broadcasting Corporation (ABC). He created Out of the Bag (first broadcast, 31 August 1940), a radio series described by the editor of Wireless Weekly as "the best variety show yet heard here". In June 1941, he moved to 3DB, a commercial radio station in Melbourne. In 1944, he returned to ABC as federal director of light entertainment. In 1946, he resigned to return to the BBC. In 1947, he was reappointed by ABC to his former position. In 1949, he spent six months on leave in England; while there, he produced several more programmes for the BBC. He resigned from the ABC in 1954.

In 195759, he produced several programmes for ABC television on a contract basis.

Selected productions 
The listings include the network for which the programme was made; the years in which Pringle was involved; and (where known) the number of episodes (in parentheses).
 Cabaret, BBC 193739, 1946 (68)
 Cabaret Cruise, BBC 193739, 1946, 1949 (15)
 Cafe Continental, ABC 195860 
 Comedy Cabaret, BBC 1938 (5)
 Intimate Cabaret, BBC 193738 (7)
 Out of the Bag, ABC (radio) 194041
 Rooftop Rendezvous, ABC 1959
 Tele-Variety, ABC 195758 (3)
 Variety, BBC 193739, 1946, 1949 (32)
 Western Cabaret, BBC 1939 (5)

Notes

References

External links 
 ; in England 193739, 194546, 1949
 ; in Australia 195759
 

1903 births
1985 deaths
Australian radio producers
Australian television producers
BBC television producers